Ciron is a commune in the Indre department in central France. It is notable for its twelfth-century lanterne des morts, Eglise Saint-Georges, and the chateau Romefort by the picturesque river Creuse. An abandoned railroad goes through the village south of national route D951, which bisects the village.

Geography
The commune is located in the parc naturel régional de la Brenne. The river Creuse borders the commune to the south. There is one bridge crossing over the Creuse in Ciron that connects the commune with the medieval chateau of Romefort, which dates from the era of the Hundred Year War between the English and the French crowns. Romefort consists of the donjon and a residential wing, and there is the ruins of a notable attached watermill by the Creuse river.

Population

See also
Communes of the Indre department

References

Communes of Indre